Charles Edward Stewart Jr. (September 1, 1916 – October 28, 1994) was a United States district judge of the United States District Court for the Southern District of New York.

Education and career

Born September 1, 1916, in Glen Ridge, New Jersey, Stewart received a Bachelor of Arts degree from Harvard University in 1938 and a Bachelor of Laws from Harvard Law School in 1948. During World War II, he served as an Army Captain in General George S. Patton's tank corps, and won the Bronze Star. He was in private practice in New York City, New York from 1948 to 1972.

Federal judicial service

Stewart was nominated by President Richard Nixon on June 15, 1972, to a seat on the United States District Court for the Southern District of New York vacated by Judge Sidney Sugarman. He was confirmed by the United States Senate on June 28, 1972, and received his commission on June 30, 1972. He assumed senior status on January 2, 1985. His service terminated on October 28, 1994, due to his death in Poughkeepsie, New York.

References

Sources
 
 

1916 births
1994 deaths
People from Glen Ridge, New Jersey
Harvard Law School alumni
Judges of the United States District Court for the Southern District of New York
United States district court judges appointed by Richard Nixon
20th-century American judges
20th-century American lawyers